Ernst Johann Lemmermann (27 May 1867 in Bremen – 11 May 1915 in Bremen) was a German botanist who specialized in the field of phycology.

During his career he taught classes (Seminarlehrer) in Bremen, where he also worked as a botanical assistant at the Städtisches Museum für Natur-, Völker- und Handelskunde. In Bremen he was an instructor to biologist Friedrich Hustedt (1886-1968), who named the diatom species of Achnanthes lemmermannii in honor of his former teacher in 1933. 

He was also honoured in 1942, in Lemmermanniella, which is a genus of cyanobacteria belonging to the family Synechococcaceae, and Lemmermannia which is a genus of fresh water trebouxiophyceans, named in 1904. 
Also, the blue-green algae species, Anabaena lemmermannii was named after Lemmermann, now a synonym of Dolichospermum lemmermannii .

Published works 
 Algologische Beiträge (IV-V), 1898.
 Ergebnisse einer Reise nach dem Pacific (H. Schauinsland, 1896/97) : Plankton-algen, 1899 - Findings from a journey to the Pacific (Hugo Hermann Schauinsland, 1896-97): Plankton-algae.
 Das Genus Ophiocytium Naegeli, 1899.
 Flagellatae, Chlorophyceae, Coccosphaerales und Silicoflagellatae (1908) in: Nordisches Plankton by Karl Andreas Heinrich Brandt and Carl Apstein (editors) – Flagellatae, Chlorophyceae, Coccosphaerales and Silicoflagellatae.
 Das Plankton schwedischer Gewässer, 1904 - Plankton of Swedish waterways.
 Pantostomatineae, Protomastiginae, distomatinae, 1914.

References 

Scientists from Bremen
1915 deaths
1867 births
German phycologists
20th-century German botanists
19th-century German botanists